"The Necklace" is a short story by French writer Guy de Maupassant. It is known for its twist ending (ironic ending), which was a hallmark of de Maupassant's style. The story was first published on 17 February 1884 in the French newspaper Le Gaulois.

Plot 
Madame Mathilde Loisel has always imagined herself an aristocrat, yearning for wealth and admiration despite having been born into a family of clerks. Her husband is a low-paid clerk who tries his best to make her happy but has little to give. After much effort, he secures for them an invitation to a ball sponsored by the Ministry of Education. 

Mathilde refuses to go because she has nothing to wear and wishes not to be embarrassed. Upset at her displeasure, Loisel gives her 400 francs (approx. $2,531.20 USD in 2022) – all the money he had been saving to go hunting with his friends – so she can buy a dress. Even after Mathilde does so, she is still unhappy because she has no jewels to wear with it. She spurns Loisel's idea of wearing fresh flowers but takes his suggestion of borrowing some jewelry from her friend, Madame Jeanne Forestier. The only item she borrows is a diamond necklace.

Mathilde enjoys herself at the ball, dancing with influential men and reveling in their admiration. Once she and Loisel return home, though, she discovers that she has lost Jeanne's necklace. Unable to find it or anyone who knows where it may have gone, they resign themselves to buying a replacement. At the Palais-Royal shops they find a similar necklace priced at 40,000 francs (approx. $253,141.59 USD in 2022) and bargain for it, eventually settling at 36,000 ($227,827.40 USD). Loisel uses an inheritance from his father to cover half the cost and borrows the rest at high interest. Mathilde gives the necklace to Jeanne without mentioning the loss of the original and Jeanne does not notice the difference.

Loisel and Mathilde move into a shabby apartment and live in poverty for ten years, with him taking on night work as a copyist to earn extra money and her sacrificing her beauty to work as a charwoman. After all the loans are paid off, Mathilde encounters Jeanne by chance on the Champs-Élysées; however, Jeanne barely recognizes her owing to her shabby clothing and unkempt appearance. Mathilde tells Jeanne about the loss and replacement of the necklace and of the hard times she has endured on Jeanne's account, blaming her for the misery of the past decade. A horrified Jeanne reveals that the necklace she had lent to Mathilde was made of paste and worth no more than 500 francs ($3,164.26 USD).

Themes 
One of the themes in The Necklace is the dichotomy between reality and appearance. Madame Loisel is beautiful on the outside but inside she is discontented with her less-than-wealthy lifestyle. Mathilde is gripped by a greed that contrasts with her husband's kind generosity. She believes that material wealth will bring her joy, and her pride prevents her from admitting to Madame Forestier that she is not rich and that she has lost the necklace she borrowed.

Because of her pride and obsession with wealth, Mathilde loses ten years of her life and spends all of her savings on replacing the necklace only to find out that the original necklace was a fake. While it is true the Madame Loisel is at fault, however we also find that Mathilde's sin of vanity scarecely surpasses the trouble she had to go through to pay for the 'false' necklace.

The story demonstrates the value of honesty; had Mathilde told Madame Forestier the truth, she would likely have been able to replace the necklace easily.
This story represents a world in which people search for happiness in material wealth.

Literary Tradition 
The Necklace manifests the literary tradition of Realism where a story is told with all its realistic elements and without over dramatization. Maupassant does not explore the inner conflicts of the characters, but rather describes their desires in simple words and narrates the sequence of events in simple language.

Adaptations and other influence 
The following are direct adaptations of "The Necklace":
The Diamond Necklace (1921), a British silent film directed by Denison Clift and starring Milton Rosmer, Jessie Winter, and Warwik Ward 
 A String of Pearls (1926 film) (《一串珍珠》) (1926), a Chinese film directed by Li Zeyuan
 "The Necklace" (1949), the first episode of the NBC-TV series Your Show Time (producer Stanley Rubin won the first-ever Emmy Award for this episode)
 "The Diamond Necklace" (1975), episode #276 of the CBS Radio Mystery Theater radio show series adapted by George Lowther.
 Mathilde (2008), a stage musical by the Irish composer Conor Mitchell
 "දියමන්ති මාලය" (Diyamanthi Maalaya), a translation by K. G. Karunathilake
 ″The Necklace″is included in Indian and Chinese secondary school language textbooks.

The following works were inspired in part by "The Necklace":
 "Paste" (1899), a short story by Henry James in which the twist ending is reversed
 "Mr. Know-All" (1925) and "A String of Beads" (1943), short stories by Somerset Maugham that both revolve around the price of a necklace
 "The Diamond Pendant" in Impact #1, E.C. Comics, March/April 1955; adaptation by Carl Wessler, illustrated by Graham Ingels
 Doctor Innocentanu (2012), a Malayalam family drama film is inspired from The Necklace but have some changes.
 Vennila Veedu (2014), a Tamil family drama uses a similar story as its main theme.
 The subplot of the season 4 episode 13 of Mom ("A Bouncy Castle and an Aneurysm" OAD: 9 Feb, 2017) is a comedic version of the story with Anna Faris' character losing the necklace belonging to her wealthy friend.
 In Vladimir Nabokov's novel Ada or Ardor (1969), one of the characters, a writer, claims she has written a short story entitled "La Rivière du diamants", which mimics Maupassant's "The Necklace". The moment in which this occurs is set in the book to be around 1884, the year in which Maupassant actually published his short story.

References

External links
 
 
 
 
 
 The Necklace – Annotated text aligned to Common Core Standards

Short stories by Guy de Maupassant
Short stories adapted into films
1884 short stories
Works originally published in Le Gaulois